José Luis Riera (30 September 1916 – 1987) was a Spanish modern pentathlete. He competed at the 1948 Summer Olympics.

References

1916 births
1987 deaths
Spanish male modern pentathletes
Olympic modern pentathletes of Spain
Modern pentathletes at the 1948 Summer Olympics